Heikki Markus Seppä, also known as Heiki Seppa (March 8, 1927 – May 18, 2010) was a Finnish-born American master metalsmith, educator, and author. He taught at Washington University in St. Louis, from 1965 to 1992.

Early life and education 
Heikki Seppä was born in Säkkijärvi, Finland. In 1941 he studied metalsmithing at Goldsmith's School in Helsinki, and later at the Georg Jensen silver factory in Copenhagen. In 1950 he emigrated with his first wife to Prince Rupert, British Columbia. Then they moved to Bloomfield Hills, Michigan, where he attended Cranbrook Academy of Art.

Career 
Seppä taught art in Louisville, Kentucky from 1960 to 1965. He later taught at the St. Louis School of Fine Arts at Washington University in St. Louis from 1965 until his retirement at 1992 as Professor Emeritus. His metal sculptures are in private collections, as well as in museums including the Renwick Gallery of the Smithsonian American Art Museum.

Replicas of Seppä's sculpture "The Search" are given to awardees of the Eliot Society's "Search Award" at Washington University.

Personal life 
For much of his childhood, Seppä lived in a children's home until leaving at age 14 to attend the Goldsmith's School. His first wife emigrated with him from Finland and they stayed together until her passing in 1993. In 1998, he moved to Bainbridge Island, Washington and married metalsmith Laurie A. Lyall. He died at his Bainbridge home at age 83.

Awards 
 American Craft Council Fellow and national treasure, 1987
 Art and Education Council Award, St. Louis, 1996
 The Hans Christiansen award, Society of American Silversmiths, 2003

Bibliography 
Form Emphasis for Metalsmiths (1978)

References 

1927 births
2010 deaths
People from Vyborg District
Finnish emigrants to the United States
American artists
American metalsmiths
Washington University in St. Louis faculty